Wacky World of Sports, known in Japan as , is a video game by Sega for the Wii console. Featuring non-conventional sports like tuna tossing, lumberjack sports and cheese wheel rolling, among other fanciful and fictional activities.

References

External links
Wacky World of Sports at Sega
Official website 

2009 video games
Sega video games
Fantasy sports video games
Wii-only games
Wii games
Lumberjack sports
Video games developed in Japan
Multiplayer and single-player video games